Boris Ivchenko was a Ukrainian actor and film director. He was the son of another Ukrainian and Soviet film director, Viktor Ivchenko.

Biography
Ivchenko was born on 29 January 1941 in Zaporizhia, Ukrainian SSR. He graduated from the Kiev State Institute of Theatrical Arts in 1966. All his life Ivchenko worked at the Dovzhenko Film Studios. He died on 28 June 1990 and is buried at the Baikove Cemetery.

Filmography

Actor
 1958 E.A. — Extraordinary Accident
 1960 Fortress on wheels
 1960 Human blood - not water
 1961 Dmytro Horytsvit
 1968 Annychka
 1979 Babylon XX

Film director
 1966 Intermission
 1968 Annychka
 1971 Olesya
 1972 The Lost Letter
 1973 When a Person Smiled
 1974 Maryna
 1976 Memory of Land
 1979 Under the Constellation Gemini
 1980 Tomorrow's Bread
 1981 Two Days in December
 1982 Starry Travel
 1983 Sudden Ejection
 1990 Stories About Ivan

External links
 
 Kino-Kolo. Cinema portal.

1941 births
1990 deaths
Actors from Zaporizhzhia
Ukrainian film directors
Soviet film directors
Soviet male actors
Kyiv National I. K. Karpenko-Kary Theatre, Cinema and Television University alumni
Burials at Baikove Cemetery